Barrancos ( Barranquenho: Barrancu) is a town and a municipality in Portugal. With a population of 1,834 in 2011, it is the least populated municipality in mainland Portugal. Its area is 168.42 km2.

The municipality is composed of one parish, being one of the six Portuguese municipalities composed of only one parish, and is located in Beja District, close to the Spanish border.

Among its economic activities are agriculture and livestock rising, being a production center for presunto (dry-cured ham), similar to the jamón ibérico, made from Black Iberian Pig (also known as Porco Alentejano).

The present Mayor is António Pica Tereno, elected by the Unitary Democratic Coalition.

The municipal holiday is August 28. Barrancos is famous in Portugal for its festival, which takes place each year during the last four days of August, and where traditional bullfighting occurs in the town's main square.

History

The territory where the Barrancos municipality stands today was initially conquered from the Moors in 1167, by Gonçalo Mendes da Maia, and the area's population was ordered by D. Sancho I in 1200. The original municipality was then located in the village of Noudar, which would only be definitively incorporated in the Kingdom of Portugal in the year 1295, when it was granted foral by D. Dinis. Noudar village was extinct in 1825, beginning a slow process of abandonment and migration to Barrancos.

Noudar, with its castle and old village ruins, is today one of the landmarks of the region. It is located 12 km to the northwest of Barrancos.

Language
In Barrancos, the Barranquenho language is spoken. Since 2021, this language is protected in the municipality.

Notable people 
 Paulo Guerra (born 1970 in Barrancos) a Portuguese former long-distance runner who specialized in the 10,000 metres and cross-country running

Gallery

References

External links
 Photos from Barrancos
 Parque de Natureza de Noudar
 Web Iberic Ham of P.D.O. Barrancos

Towns in Portugal
Populated places in Beja District
Municipalities of Beja District